North Robinson is a village in Crawford County, Ohio, United States. The population was 205 at the 2010 census.

History
North Robinson was laid out in 1861. It was named for the Robinson family of pioneer settlers.

On September 4, 2017 a tornado which turned out to be the only one of the day struck the village doing high end EF2 damage to a house.

Geography
North Robinson is located at  (40.792804, -82.857596).

Demographics

2010 census
As of the census of 2010, there were 205 people, 82 households, and 64 families living in the village. The racial makeup of the village was 97.6% White, 0.5% Asian, and 2.0% from two or more races. Hispanic or Latino of any race were 2.9% of the population.

There were 82 households, of which 31.7% had children under the age of 18 living with them, 59.8% were married couples living together, 11.0% had a female householder with no husband present, 7.3% had a male householder with no wife present, and 22.0% were non-families. 19.5% of all households were made up of individuals, and 9.8% had someone living alone who was 65 years of age or older. The average household size was 2.50 and the average family size was 2.77.

The median age in the village was 41.8 years. 24.4% of residents were under the age of 18; 4.9% were between the ages of 18 and 24; 26.9% were from 25 to 44; 28.3% were from 45 to 64; and 15.6% were 65 years of age or older. The gender makeup of the village was 50.7% male and 49.3% female.

2000 census
As of the census of 2000, there were 211 people, 82 households, and 61 families living in the village. The population density was 2,153.3 people per square mile (814.7/km2). There were 88 housing units at an average density of 898.1 per square mile (339.8/km2). The racial makeup of the village was 99.05% White, 0.47% Pacific Islander, 0.47% from other races.

There were 82 households, out of which 31.7% had children under the age of 18 living with them, 67.1% were married couples living together, 3.7% had a female householder with no husband present, and 25.6% were non-families. 22.0% of all households were made up of individuals, and 12.2% had someone living alone who was 65 years of age or older. The average household size was 2.57 and the average family size was 3.03.

In the village, the population was spread out, with 23.2% under the age of 18, 8.1% from 18 to 24, 25.1% from 25 to 44, 31.8% from 45 to 64, and 11.8% who were 65 years of age or older. The median age was 42 years. For every 100 females there were 90.1 males. For every 100 females age 18 and over, there were 90.6 males.

The median income for a household in the village was $30,625, and the median income for a family was $38,750. Males had a median income of $27,250 versus $21,250 for females. The per capita income for the village was $13,110. About 7.2% of families and 8.9% of the population were below the poverty line, including 12.9% of those under the age of eighteen and none of those 65 or over.

References

Villages in Crawford County, Ohio
Villages in Ohio